Collver is a surname. Notable people with the surname include:

Bill Collver (1867–1888), American baseball player
Dick Collver (1936–2014), Canadian politician
Ethel Blanchard Collver (1875–1955), American painter

See also
Collier (surname)